Mathieu Chabert (born 5 December 1978) is a French football manager and a former player who played as a goalkeeper. He was recently the manager of Châteauroux in Championnat National.

Playing career
Chabert was a goalkeeper and was part of Saint-Étienne's youth academy, and briefly joined Udinese in Italy, and Ayr United in Scotland before spending the rest of his playing career in the lower leagues of France.

Managerial career
Chabert joined Béziers in 2011 as an assistant, and became the senior coach in 2013. Chabert helped promote AS Béziers into the French Ligue 2 for the first time in their history in 2018.

In late October 2019 Chabert left Béziers to manage SC Bastia, dropping a league in what was reported as a surprise move. He led Bastia to promotion to Ligue 2 in the 2020–21 season. On 22 September 2021, he was dismissed by Bastia after gaining 7 points in the first 9 games of the Ligue 2 season.

On 14 October 2021, he was hired by Châteauroux, returning to Championnat National.More than a year later we sacked on November the 29th.

References

External links
 Anciens Verts Profile
 
 

1979 births
Living people
Sportspeople from Béziers
Association football goalkeepers
French footballers
Udinese Calcio players
Ayr United F.C. players
FC Rouen players
AS Béziers Hérault (football) players
Serie A players
Scottish Professional Football League players
Championnat National 2 players
French expatriate footballers
French expatriate sportspeople in Scotland
French expatriate sportspeople in Italy
Expatriate footballers in Scotland
Expatriate footballers in Italy
French football managers
AS Béziers (2007) managers
FC Sète 34 managers
SC Bastia managers
LB Châteauroux managers
Ligue 2 managers
Championnat National managers
Footballers from Occitania (administrative region)